In British film classifications, the E certificate is an unofficial rating sometimes applied to video titles released in the United Kingdom which are exempt from being classified by the British Board of Film Classification (BBFC) as any of the other certificate categories.

Material that is exempt from classification sometimes displays symbols similar to BBFC certificates, for example an E "certificate", on their packaging or promotional materials. There is no legal obligation, nor a particular scheme, for labelling material that is exempt from classification.

The BBFC do not view any material which is exempt from classification and therefore do not issue any certificate of any kind.  The decision to release any title as exempt from classification is not made by the BBFC, but by the distributors and/or producers themselves who have the responsibility of ensuring that it would be suitable for exemption. The "E" symbol has no legal standing itself, and local Trading Standards officers may confiscate material bearing a distributor-applied "E" symbol if they believe that it is not exempt. The distributor may then be subject to prosecution under the Video Recordings Act 2010.

Some producers may wish to have their work classified even though they may be exempt, as the public tend to be more familiar with proper certificates and it also provides more legal backing.

Requirements
The classifications usually applies to films which are primarily to inform, educate or instruct as opposed to entertain.  It can also apply for such films which are primarily concerned with sport, religion, politics or music, provided that they do not contain material which would require classification.  Such material would include:

Human sexual activity or acts of force or restraint associated with such activity.
Mutilation or torture of, or other acts of gross violence towards, humans or animals.
Human genital organs or human urinary or excretory functions.
Techniques likely to be useful in the commission of offences; or are likely to any significant extent to stimulate or encourage such sexual activities.
Likely to any extent to encourage mutilation, torture or gross violence.
Likely to any significant extent to stimulate or encourage the commission of offences.

If the work does include any of the above elements or is likely to stimulate or encourage them, then the right to an exemption is lost and that work must be submitted to the Board for classification.  If a film is treated as exempt when it should have been classified, local trading standard officers can investigate and the distributors and/or vendors can be prosecuted.

There have been many music documentary DVDs released with exemption from BBFC classification despite containing bad language.  This is permitted as the bad language is not a primary factor and not excessive.

References

British Board of Film Classification